Yves Guillou (16 December 1880 – 27 February 1963) was a French politician. He was the first mayor of Caen in the post-war era.

See also
 List of mayors of Caen

References 

1880 births
1963 deaths
People from Côtes-d'Armor
Politicians from Brittany
Rally of the French People politicians
National Centre of Independents and Peasants politicians
Mayors of Caen